Louise A. Reeves Archer (October 23, 1893 – April 1, 1948) was an American teacher and activist who fought to educate African Americans during the 1930s and 1940s. During this time, racial barriers limited a black student's access to education. They had limited resources compared to white children and were deprived education beyond seventh grade — when twelve grades was already common practice.

A dedicated teacher, Louise Archer brought Vienna's African American community together in service to its school.

Early life
Louise Reeves grew up in North Carolina and attended Livingstone College. She taught school in Southampton County, Virginia, where she married Romulus C. Archer Jr. in 1915. They moved to Washington, D.C., in 1922 and she continued her education, later earning a B.S. from Morgan State College.

Career in education

In 1922 Archer became teacher and principal for a one-room segregated school in Vienna, Virginia. Devoted to her students, she often transported children to school herself and worked to improve their learning experience. She organized a Parent-Teacher Association to raise funds for supplies and a new building, which opened in 1939 with three rooms. In 1941 students, parents, and faculty raised $300, which paid for a music teacher, bus expenses, kitchen supplies, and the installation of electric lights. Archer also established one of Fairfax County's earliest 4-H Clubs for African Americans and her students participated in garden projects to raise vegetables for lunches prepared at school.

Archer provided a high-quality education. In addition to the academic curriculum, she taught sewing, cooking, music, and poetry to her students in fifth through seventh grades, which was then the highest level of public education available to African Americans in the county. After Archer's death, families petitioned the county to name the school in her honor. Louise Archer Elementary School continues to remember her service to the community with an annual celebration in her honor.

In 1948, Archer died of a heart attack; the school was renamed Louise Archer Elementary School in her honor in 1950.

References

External
Arlington National Cemetery
 Louise Archer Elementary School website

Livingstone College alumni
Morgan State University alumni
Burials at Arlington National Cemetery
20th-century American educators
Educators from North Carolina
Educators from Virginia
People from Vienna, Virginia
1893 births
1948 deaths
People from Fayetteville, North Carolina
20th-century American women educators
20th-century African-American women
20th-century African-American people
20th-century African-American educators